Dance of a Dream is a 2001 Hong Kong romantic comedy film co-produced and directed by the film's cinematographer, Andrew Lau and starring Andy Lau, Anita Mui and Sandra Ng.

Plot
Namson Lau (Andy Lau) is a ballroom dancing instructor. On stage, he is a refined and suave gentleman, but in reality, he is cunning and greedy, and dancing has become a mean to strike fortune for him, without any other levels of significance. Kam (Sandra Ng) possesses mediocre qualifications and have been living a dull life in toil, but is optimistic in nature. One time in a ball held by aristocrat Tina Cheung (Anita Mui), Namson performs a dance with Tina which Kam witnesses, who is enchanted by Namson's elegant dance movements, and decides to enroll in Namson's dance courses, hoping to fulfill of dream of dancing elegantly with him. Meanwhile, Namson was also entrusted by Tina's younger brother, Jimmy (Edison Chen), to instruct his sister in tango. On one hand, Kam works hard in part-time jobs to pay her dance tuition, while on the other hand, Namson works to fulfill his dream of buying his dream dance studio in Central and participate in the Blackpool Dance Festival in England. Because of this, Namson have been neglecting the influence that dance brings to his students, and only cares about making money from his students, like the time where he met Tina at the ball, where his cool was to lure Tina into taking dance lessons from him and earning high tuition fees.

While teaching Tina and Kam, Namson gradually realizes how he has been lost about the art of dance. Seeing him in this condition, Kam organizes a party with her fellow dance students for Namson to be happy. The joy of the students dancing in the party gave a positive influence to Namson and the unsociable Tina, who becomes more outgoing. Afterwards, Tina also teaches Kam tango that she learned from Namson, and also purchases Namson's dream studio as a gift to him. At this time, Namson realizes he had fallen in love with Kam. Namson also gets into a moral dilemma of whether to be with Tina in order to fulfill his dream, or Kam, whom he truly loves and who has been highly supportive of him.

Cast and roles
 Andy Lau as Namson Lau
 Sandra Ng as Kam
 Anita Mui as Tina Cheung
 Edison Chen as Jimmy Cheung
 Gordon Lam as Faye Wong Yat-fei
 Cherrie Ying as June
 Ronald Cheng as Yip Wai-shun
 Suzanne Chung	as Mrs. Yip	
 Lam Chi-chung as Fatty	
 Halina Tam as Kam's housemate
 Belinda Hamnett as Kam's housemate
 Shirley Huang as Shirley
 Stephanie Chan
 Esther Koo
 Maggie Leung

Music

Accolades

References

External links 
 

2001 films
2001 romantic comedy films
2000s musical films
Hong Kong romantic comedy films
Ballroom dancing films
Tango films
2000s Cantonese-language films
Media Asia films
Films produced by Andy Lau
Films directed by Andrew Lau
Films set in Hong Kong
Films shot in Hong Kong
2000s Hong Kong films
2000s Argentine films